Claduncaria ochrochlaena is a species of moth of the family Tortricidae. It is found in the Dominican Republic.

References

Archipini
Moths described in 1999
Moths of the Caribbean
Taxa named by Józef Razowski